Giulianova Calcio S.r.l. was an Italian association football club based in Giulianova, Abruzzo. The team failed to renew its license for professional football in 2012. After 4 years' dormancy, the new owner of the club applied to play in 2016–17 5-a-side football, composed of players from folded Città di Giulianova.

After 2012, few phoenix clubs emerged: A.S.D. Città di Giulianova 1924, A.S.D. Calcio Giulianova, A.S.D. Piccoli Giallorossi and A.S.D. Real Giulianova. Some teams had been temporarily granted the rights to use the logo of Giulianova Calcio, by A.S.D. Giuliesi per Sempre, the owner of the logo which was purchased from the bankruptcy auctions.

History
The first town team, blue Giuliese, was created in 1924 without particular honours.

The club was founded in 1936 and played for most of its history in national Italian championships, especially in Serie C.

On 30 June 2012 Giulianova did not submit the application to 2012–13 Lega Pro Seconda Divisione due to financial reason. The membership of Giulianova Calcio S.r.l. in FIGC was revoked in 2013.

On 19 July 2012 former chairman of the club, Dario D'Agostino, was suspended for 8 months, as well as 2 points deduction in 2012–13 season to the official phoenix club of Giulianova (if any). Another director, Antonio Serena, was also suspended for around 100 days due to administration irregularities on 9 February 2012.

Legacy
The assets of Giulianova Calcio, including the logo, and trophies, were acquired by A.S.D. Giuliesi per Sempre aka A.S.D. Giulianova Calcio, which grants other teams to use the logo temporary.

However, as Città di Giulianova did not renew the loan of the logo in 2015, as well as other youth teams had rely on the agreement with Città di Giulianova, the non-renewal of loan, making all team cannot use the club logo.

A.S.D. Città di Giulianova 1924, was the highest ranking team from Giulianova in the national league, which was relocated from Cologna Paese frazione, Roseto degli Abruzzi, in the Province of Teramo. The team relegated from 2015–16 Serie D (fourth tier). The team folded in 2016.

Another team, A.S.D. Calcio Giulianova, was a merger of "Scuola Calcio Giulianova", a youth academy and "Colleranesco", a team in local amateur football located in the frazione of the same name. The team relegated from 2015 to 2016 Promozione Abruzzo (sixth tier). The team withdrew from senior football in 2016.

The third team, A.S.D. Piccoli Giallorossi, was another youth academy.

In 2016 A.S.D. Real Giulianova became another illegitimate phoenix clubs after Città di Giulianova was folded. Real Giulianova was a team in 2016–17 Promozione Abruzzo. The club was relocated from Castellalto, in the Province of Teramo. The club won promotion to Eccellenza in 2017.

A.S.D. Giulianova Calcio also return to football league by entering local 5-a-side football, by hiring players of former Città di Giulianova.

A.S.D. Giulianova Annunziata was another team from Giulianova which was participated in 2016–17 Prima Categoria.

Notable players

Italian internationals
 Gennaro Delvecchio

Colors and badge
Its colours are yellow and red.

Stadium
It plays its home matches at Stadio Rubens Fadini.

References

External links
 
 Unofficial site 

Football clubs in Abruzzo
Association football clubs established in 1924
1924 establishments in Italy
Association football clubs disestablished in 2012
2012 disestablishments in Italy
Association football clubs established in 2016
2016 establishments in Italy
Re-established companies
Serie C clubs
Giulianova